Mordellistena basithorax is a beetle in the genus Mordellistena of the family Mordellidae. It was described in 1929 by Píc.

References

basithorax
Beetles described in 1929